Korsun-Shevchenkivskyi is a small city located in Cherkasy Raion of Cherkasy Oblast (province) in central Ukraine. It hosts the administration of Korsun-Shevchenkivskyi urban hromada, one of the hromadas of Ukraine. The city rests on the banks of the Ros River. Population:

History
A fortress Korsun was founded in 1032 by the Kievan Rus' prince Yaroslav the Wise and served the protection of Kyiv from nomads from the southern steppe regions. The name of the city comes from the Greek city of Chersones (translated as Korsun) on the Crimean Peninsula. In 1240, Korsun was destroyed by Batu Khan. In 1584, a military base was established in the city.

In the early modern times the place belonged to the Polish–Lithuanian Commonwealth, during which another fortress was built and the city received the Magdeburg rights. In 1630, Cossack rebels led by Taras Fedorovych attacked the town and destroyed its Polish garrison. The town was razed by Polish forces during the 1637 Cossack rebellion led by Pavlo Pavliuk. In 1648, the Battle of Korsuń during the Khmelnytsky Uprising, took place here. In 1768, during the Koliyivschyna Rebellion, the Polish garrison was destroyed by the forces of Maksym Zalizniak.

In 1793, Korsun was included into the Russian Empire. In 1903, one of the largest paint factories in the whole Russian Empire was built in Korsun. In the period of the Second World War (1941–1945), the Soviet Red Army defeated the German forces in the area surrounding Korsun (for further information, see Korsun Pocket). On February 14, 1944, Korsun was cleared of German forces.

In post-war years, the farm and agricultural economy of Korsun was soon rebuilt. Until 1944, the city was known simply as Korsun, however, it was later renamed in honor of Taras Shevchenko, a famous Ukrainian poet and artist.

According to Russian media, Euromaidan supporters brutalized a  bus convoy of anti-Maidan activists on the night of February 20–21, 2014 in Korsun-Shevchenkivskyi, Cherkasy Oblast, burned several buses, and killed seven passengers. On April 3, 2014, Russian forces occupying Crimea said seven people had died and 30 gone missing. Amnesty International, Human Rights Watch and the local police force all questioned the accuracy of this account. However, Russian leader Putin said this story was the reason for the military operation in Crimea, and the alleged killings of anti-Maidan activists near Korsun were later reflected in the partisan Russian documentary Crimea. The Way Home.

Until 18 July 2020, Korsun-Shevchenkivskyi served as an administrative center of Korsun-Shevchenkivskyi Raion. The raion was abolished in July 2020 as part of the administrative reform of Ukraine, which reduced the number of raions of Cherkasy Oblast to four. The area of Korsun-Shevchenkivskyi Raion was split between Cherkasy and Zvenyhorodka Raions, with Korsun-Shevchenkivskyi being transferred to Cherkasy Raion.

Economy
Korsun-Shevchenkivskyi contains a railroad station Korsun, on the railroad line Kyiv-Zvitkovo. Korsun-Shevchenkivskyi also contains many industrial factories, namely some mechanical factories, a construction material factory, an asphalt factory, a winemaking factory, sewing factory, and others.

Architecture
 A park complex belonging to the former palace of the noble Lopukhin-Demydov family, considered one of the best natural park complexes in the style of Romanticism in Ukraine. The park was constructed in 1782 by the request of the noble Stanisław Poniatowski, the King of Poland and Grand Duke of Lithuania, a writer and artist. In the middle of the 19th century, the park was decorated with many sculptures. In addition, small pedestrian bridges were added. Total area of the park – 97 hectares.
 The palace of the noble Lopukhin-Demydov family.
 The Korsun-Shevchenkivskyi historical-cultural preserve.
 Museum dedicated to the history of the Korsun-Shevchenkivskyi Battle.

Famous people
 Vasyl Avramenko, actor, dancer, choreographer, balletmaster, director, and film producer
 Anatoli Khorozov, president of the Ice Hockey Federation of Ukraine, hotel businessman
 Kyrylo Stetsenko, composer, conductor, critic, and teacher

International relations

Twin towns – Sister cities
Korsun-Shevchenkivskyi is twinned with:
  Chojnice, Poland
  Gifhorn, Germany.

Gallery

See also
 Korsun Pocket – 1944 battle on the Eastern Front of World War II.
 Battle of Korsun – 1648 battle during the Khmelnytsky Uprising.

References

Notes

Sources

 (1972) Історіа міст і сіл Української CCP - Черкаська область (History of Towns and Villages of the Ukrainian SSR - Cherkasy Oblast), Kyiv. 
 Korsun-Shevchenkivskyi in the Encyclopedia of Ukraine

External links

 korsun.ic.ck.ua - Website of the historical-cultural preserve in the city
 heraldry.com.ua - Coat of arms of Korsun-Shevchenkivskyi (Ukrainian)
 sunsite.berkeley.edu - Soviet topographic map 1:100,000

 
Cities in Cherkasy Oblast
Cities of district significance in Ukraine
Cossack Hetmanate
Kiev Voivodeship
Kanevsky Uyezd